Calligraphy is a visual art related to writing and is the design and execution of lettering with a pen, ink brush, or other writing instrument. Contemporary calligraphic practice can be defined as "the art of giving form to signs in an expressive, harmonious, and skillful manner".

Modern calligraphy ranges from functional inscriptions and designs to fine-art pieces where the letters may or may not be readable. Classical calligraphy differs from type design and non-classical hand-lettering, though a calligrapher may practice both.

Calligraphy continues to flourish in the forms of wedding invitations and event invitations, font design and typography, original hand-lettered logo design, religious art, announcements, graphic design and commissioned calligraphic art, cut stone inscriptions, and memorial documents. It is also used for props and moving images for film and television, and also for testimonials, birth and death certificates, maps, and other written works.

Tools

Pens and brushes 

The principal tools for a calligrapher are the pen and the brush. The pens used in calligraphy can have nibs that may be flat, round, or pointed. For some decorative purposes, multi-nibbed pens (steel brushes) can be used. However, works have also been created with felt-tip and ballpoint pens, although these works do not employ angled lines. There are some styles of calligraphy, such as Gothic script, that require a stub nib pen.

Common calligraphy pens and brushes are:
 Quill
 Dip pen
 Ink brush
 Qalam
 Fountain pen
 Chiselled marker

Inks, papers, and templates 
The ink used for writing is usually water-based and is much less viscous than the oil-based inks used in printing. Certain specialty paper with high ink absorption and constant texture enables cleaner lines, although parchment or vellum is often used, as a knife can be used to erase imperfections and a light-box is not needed to allow lines to pass through it. Normally, light boxes and templates are used to achieve straight lines without pencil markings detracting from the work. Ruled paper, either for a light box or direct use, is most often ruled every quarter or half inch, although inch spaces are occasionally used.

World traditions

East Asia 

History

In ancient China, the oldest known Chinese characters are oracle bone script, carved on ox scapulae and tortoise plastrons, because the rulers in the Shang Dynasty carved pits on such animals' bones and then baked them to gain auspice of military affairs, agricultural harvest, or even procreating and weather. During the divination ceremony, after the cracks were made, the characters were written with a brush on the shell or bone to be later carved. With the development of Bronzeware script and Large Seal script "cursive" signs continued. Mao Gong Ding is one of the most famous and typical Bronzeware scripts in Chinese calligraphic history. It has 500 characters on the bronze which is the largest number of bronze inscription we have discovered so far. Moreover, each archaic kingdom of current China had its own set of characters.

In Imperial China, the graphs on old steles some dating from 200 BCE, and in Small Seal script stylehave been preserved and can be viewed even today.

About 220 BCE, the emperor Qin Shi Huang, the first to conquer the entire Chinese basin, imposed several reforms, among them Li Si's character unification, which created a set of 3300 standardized Small Seal characters. Despite the fact that the main writing implement of the time was already the brush, few papers survive from this period, and the main examples of this style are on steles.

The Clerical script (/) which is more regularized, and in some ways similar to modern text, were also authorised under Qin Shi Huang.

Between clerical script and traditional regular script, there is another transitional type of calligraphic work called Wei Bei. It started during the North and South dynasties (420 to 589 CE) and ended before the Tang Dynasty (618–907).

Traditional regular script, still in use today, and attributed to Wang Xizhi (303–361) and his followers, is even more regularized. Its spread was encouraged by Emperor Mingzong of Later Tang (926–933), who ordered the printing of the classics using new wooden blocks in Kaishu. Printing technologies here allowed a shape stabilization. The Kaishu shape of characters 1000 years ago was mostly similar to that at the end of Imperial China. The Kangxi and current shapes have tiny differences, while stroke order is still the same, according to the old style.

Styles which did not survive include , a mix of 80% Small Seal script and 20% Clerical script. Some variant Chinese characters were unorthodox or locally used for centuries. They were generally understood but always rejected in official texts. Some of these unorthodox variants, in addition to some newly created characters, compose the simplified Chinese character set.

Technique
These instruments of writing are also known as the Four Friends of the Study in Korea. Besides the traditional four tools, desk pads and paperweights are also used.

Many different parameters influence the final result of a calligrapher's work. Physical parameters include the shape, size, stretch, and hair type of the ink brush; the color, color density and water density of the ink; as well as the paper's water absorption speed and surface texture. The calligrapher's technique also influences the result, as the look of finished characters are influenced by the quantity of ink and water the calligrapher lets the brush take and by the pressure, inclination, and direction of the brush. Changing these variables produces thinner or bolder strokes, and smooth or toothed borders. Eventually, the speed, accelerations and decelerations of a skilled calligrapher's movements aim to give "spirit" to the characters, greatly influencing their final shapes.

Styles
These styles' stroke orders vary more, sometimes creating radically different forms. The   style was highly appreciated in Emperor Wu of Han reign (140–187 CE).

Examples of modern printed styles are Song from the Song Dynasty's printing press, and sans-serif. These are not considered traditional styles, and are normally not written.

Influences
Japanese and Korean calligraphy were each greatly influenced by Chinese calligraphy. Calligraphy has also influenced ink and wash painting, which is accomplished using similar tools and techniques. Calligraphy has influenced most major art styles in East Asia, including ink and wash painting, a style of Chinese, Japanese, and Korean painting based entirely on calligraphy.

The Japanese and Koreans have also developed their own specific sensibilities and styles of calligraphy while incorporating Chinese influences.

Japan

Japanese calligraphy goes out of the set of CJK strokes to also include local alphabets such as hiragana and katakana, with specific problematics such as new curves and moves, and specific materials (Japanese paper, and Japanese ink).

Korea

The modern Korean alphabet and its use of the circle required the creation of a new technique not used in traditional Chinese calligraphy.

Mongolia

Mongolian calligraphy is also influenced by Chinese calligraphy, from tools to style.

Tibet

Tibetan calligraphy is central to Tibetan culture. The script is derived from Indic scripts. The nobles of Tibet, such as the High Lamas and inhabitants of the Potala Palace, were usually capable calligraphers. Tibet has been a center of Buddhism for several centuries, and that religion places a great deal of significance on written word. This does not provide for a large body of secular pieces, although they do exist (but are usually related in some way to Tibetan Buddhism). Almost all high religious writing involved calligraphy, including letters sent by the Dalai Lama and other religious and secular authority. Calligraphy is particularly evident on their prayer wheels, although this calligraphy was forged rather than scribed, much like Arab and Roman calligraphy is often found on buildings. Although originally done with a reed, Tibetan calligraphers now use chisel tipped pens and markers as well.

"Temporary calligraphy"
Temporary calligraphy, also called water calligraphy, is a practice of water-only calligraphy on the floor, which dries out within minutes. This practice is especially appreciated by the new generation of retired Chinese in public parks of China. These will often open studio-shops in tourist towns offering traditional Chinese calligraphy to tourists. Other than writing the clients name, they also sell fine brushes as souvenirs and limestone carved stamps.

Since late 1980s, a few Chinese artists have branched out traditional Chinese calligraphy to a new territory by mingling Chinese characters with English letters; notable new forms of calligraphy are Xu Bing's square calligraphy and DanNie's coolligraphy or cooligraphy.

Southeast Asia

Philippines
The Philippines has numerous ancient and indigenous scripts collectively called as Suyat scripts. Various ethno-linguistic groups in the Philippines prior to Spanish colonization in the 16th century up to the independence era in the 21st century have used the scripts with various mediums. By the end of colonialism, only four of the suyat scripts survived and continue to be used by certain communities in everyday life. These four scripts are Hanunó'o/Hanunoo of the Hanuno'o Mangyan people, Buhid/Build of the Buhid Mangyan people, Tagbanwa script of the Tagbanwa people, and Palaw'an/Pala'wan of the Palaw'an people. All four scripts were inscribed in the UNESCO Memory of the World Programme, under the name Philippine Paleographs (Hanunoo, Build, Tagbanua and Pala’wan), in 1999.

Due to dissent from colonialism, many artists and cultural experts have revived the usage of suyat scripts that went extinct due to Spanish persecution. These scripts being revived include the Kulitan script of the Kapampangan people, the badlit script of various Visayan ethnic groups, the Iniskaya script of the Eskaya people, the Baybayin script of the Tagalog people, and the Kur-itan script of the Ilocano people, among many others. Due to the diversity of suyat scripts, all calligraphy written in suyat scripts are collectively called as Filipino suyat calligraphy, although each are distinct from each other. Calligraphy using the Western alphabet and the Arabic alphabet are also prevalent in the Philippines due to its colonial past, but the Western alphabet and the Arabic alphabet are not considered as suyat, and therefore Western-alphabet and Arabic calligraphy are not considered as suyat calligraphy.

Vietnam

Vietnamese calligraphy is called  (literally "the way of letters or words") and is based on Chữ Nôm and Chữ Hán, an old Vietnamese writing system based on Chinese characters and replaced it with the Latin alphabet. However, the calligraphic traditions continue to be preserved.

South Asia

India

Religious texts are the most frequent purpose for Indian calligraphy. Monastic Buddhist communities had members trained in calligraphy and shared responsibility for duplicating sacred scriptures. Jaina traders incorporated illustrated manuscripts celebrating Jaina saints. These manuscripts were produced using inexpensive material, like palm leave and birch, with fine calligraphy.

Nepal
Nepalese calligraphy is primarily created using the Ranjana script. The script itself, along with its derivatives (like Lantsa, Phagpa, Kutila) are used in Nepal, Tibet, Bhutan, Leh, Mongolia, coastal Japan, and Korea to write "Om mani padme hum" and other sacred Buddhist texts, mainly those derived from Sanskrit and Pali.

Africa

Egypt
Egyptian hieroglyphs were the formal writing system used in Ancient Egypt. Hieroglyphs combined logographic, syllabic and alphabetic elements, with a total of some 1,000 distinct characters.

Ethiopia/Abyssinia

Ethiopian (Abyssinian) calligraphy began with the Ge'ez script, which replaced Epigraphic South Arabian in the Kingdom of Aksum, that was developed specifically for Ethiopian Semitic languages. In those languages that use it, such as Amharic and Tigrinya, the script is called , which means script or alphabet. The Epigraphic South Arabian letters were used for a few inscriptions into the 8th century, though not any South Arabian language since Dʿmt.

Early inscriptions in Ge'ez and Ge'ez script have been dated to as early as the 5th century BCE, and in a sort of proto-Ge'ez written in ESA since the 9th century BCE. Ge'ez literature begins with the Christianization of Ethiopia (and the civilization of Axum) in the 4th century, during the reign of Ezana of Axum.

The Ge'ez script is read from left to right and has been adapted to write other languages, usually ones that are also Semitic. The most widespread use is for Amharic in Ethiopia and Tigrinya in Eritrea and Ethiopia.

Americas

Maya civilization
Maya calligraphy was expressed via Maya glyphs; modern Maya calligraphy is mainly used on seals and monuments in the Yucatán Peninsula in Mexico. Maya glyphs are rarely used in government offices; however in Campeche, Yucatán and Quintana Roo, calligraphy in Maya languages is written in Latin script rather than Maya glyphs. Some commercial companies in southern Mexico use Maya glyphs as symbols of their business. Some community associations and modern Maya brotherhoods use Maya glyphs as symbols of their groups.

Most of the archaeological sites in Mexico such as Chichen Itza, Labna, Uxmal, Edzna, Calakmul, etc. have glyphs in their structures. Carved stone monuments known as stele are common sources of ancient Maya calligraphy.

Europe

Calligraphy in Europe recognizable in the use of the Latin script in Western Europe, and in the use of the Greek, Armenian, and Georgian, and Cyrillic scripts in Eastern Europe.

Western Europe

Roman Antiquity 
The Latin alphabet appeared about 600 BCE in ancient Rome, and by the first century CE it had developed into Roman imperial capitals carved on stones, rustic capitals painted on walls, and Roman cursive for daily use. In the second and third centuries the uncial lettering style developed. As writing withdrew to monasteries, uncial script was found more suitable for copying the Bible and other religious texts. It was the monasteries which preserved calligraphic traditions during the fourth and fifth centuries, when the Roman Empire fell and Europe entered the early Middle Ages.

At the height of the Roman Empire, its power reached as far as Great Britain; when the empire fell, its literary influence remained. The Semi-uncial generated the Irish Semi-uncial, the small Anglo-Saxon. Each region developed its own standards following the main monastery of the region (i.e. Merovingian script, Laon script, Luxeuil script, Visigothic script, Beneventan script), which are mostly cursive and hardly readable.

Middle Ages 
Christian churches promoted the development of writing through the prolific copying of the Bible, the Breviary, and other sacred texts. Two distinct styles of writing known as uncial and half-uncial (from the Latin , or "inch") developed from a variety of Roman bookhands. The 7th–9th centuries in northern Europe were the heyday of Celtic illuminated manuscripts, such as the Book of Durrow, Lindisfarne Gospels and the Book of Kells.

Charlemagne's devotion to improved scholarship resulted in the recruiting of "a crowd of scribes", according to Alcuin, the Abbot of York. Alcuin developed the style known as the Caroline or Carolingian minuscule. The first manuscript in this hand was the Godescalc Evangelistary (finished 783)a Gospel book written by the scribe Godescalc. Carolingian remains the one progenitor hand from which modern booktype descends.

In the eleventh century, the Caroline evolved into the blackletter ("Gothic") script, which was more compact and made it possible to fit more text on a page. The Gothic calligraphy styles became dominant throughout Europe; and in 1454, when Johannes Gutenberg developed the first printing press in Mainz, Germany, he adopted the Gothic style, making it the first typeface.

Renaissance 
The 17th century saw the Batarde script from France, and the 18th century saw the English script spread across Europe and world through their books.

In the mid-1600s French officials, flooded with documents written in various hands and varied levels of skill, complained that many such documents were beyond their ability to decipher.  The Office of the Financier thereupon restricted all legal documents to three hands, namely the Coulee, the Rhonde, (known as Round hand in English) and a Speed Hand sometimes called the Bastarda.

While there were many great French masters at the time, the most influential in proposing these hands was Louis Barbedor, who published Les Ecritures Financière Et Italienne Bastarde Dans Leur Naturel circa 1650.

With the destruction of the Camera Apostolica during the sack of Rome (1527), the capitol for writing masters moved to Southern France. By 1600, the Italic Cursiva began to be replaced by a technological refinement, the Italic Chancery Circumflessa, which in turn fathered the Rhonde and later English Roundhand.

In England, Ayres and Banson popularized the Round Hand while Snell is noted for his reaction to them, and warnings of restraint and proportionality. Still Edward Crocker began publishing his copybooks 40 years before the aforementioned.

Eastern Europe
Other European styles use the same tools and practices, but differ by character set and stylistic preferences.
For Slavonic lettering, the history of the Slavonic and consequently Russian writing systems differs fundamentally from the one of the Latin language. It evolved from the 10th century to today.

Style
Unlike a typeface, handwritten calligraphy is characterised by irregularity in the characters which vary in size, shape, style, and color, producing a distinct aesthetic value, although it may also make the content illegible to readers. As with Chinese or Islamic calligraphy, Western calligraphic script employed the use of strict rules and shapes. Quality writing had a rhythm and regularity to the letters, with a "geometrical" order of the lines on the page. Each character had, and often still has, a precise stroke order.

Sacred Western calligraphy has some unique features, such as the illumination of the first letter of each book or chapter in medieval times. A decorative "carpet page" may precede the literature, filled with ornate, geometrical depictions of bold-hued animals. The Lindisfarne Gospels (715–720 CE) are an early example. Many of the themes and variations of today's contemporary Western calligraphy are found in the pages of The Saint John's Bible. A particularly modern example is Timothy Botts' illustrated edition of the Bible, with 360 calligraphic images as well as a calligraphy typeface.

Islamic world

Islamic calligraphy has evolved alongside Islam and the Arabic language. As it is based on Arabic letters, some call it "Arabic calligraphy". However the term "Islamic calligraphy" is a more appropriate term as it comprises all works of calligraphy by Muslim calligraphers of different national cultures, like Persian or Ottoman calligraphy, from Al-Andalus in medieval Spain to China.

Islamic calligraphy is associated with geometric Islamic art (arabesque) on the walls and ceilings of mosques as well as on the page or other materials. Contemporary artists in the Islamic world may draw on the heritage of calligraphy to create modern calligraphic inscriptions, like corporate logos, or abstractions.

Instead of recalling something related to the spoken word, calligraphy for Muslims is a visible expression of the highest art of all, the art of the spiritual world. Calligraphy has arguably become the most venerated form of Islamic art because it provides a link between the languages of the Muslims with the religion of Islam. The Qur'an has played an important role in the development and evolution of the Arabic language, and by extension, calligraphy in the Arabic alphabet. Proverbs and passages from the Qur'an are still sources for Islamic calligraphy.

During the Ottoman civilization, Islamic calligraphy attained special prominence. The city of Istanbul is an open exhibition hall for all kinds and varieties of calligraphy, from inscriptions in mosques to fountains, schools, houses, etc.

Persia

Persian calligraphy has been present in the Persian region before Islamisation. In Zoroastrianism, beautiful and clear writings were always praised.

Antiquity 
It is believed that ancient Persian script was invented by about 600–500 BCE to provide monument inscriptions for the Achaemenid kings. These scripts consisted of horizontal, vertical, and diagonal nail-shape letters, which is why it is called cuneiform script (lit. "script of nails") in Persian. Centuries later, other scripts such as "Pahlavi" and "Avestan" scripts were used in ancient Persia. Pahlavi was a middle Persian script developed from the Aramaic script and became the official script of the Sassanian empire (224–651 CE).

Contemporary scripts 
The Nasta'liq style is the most popular contemporary style among classical Persian calligraphy scripts; Persian calligraphers call it the "bride of calligraphy scripts". This calligraphy style has been based on such a strong structure that it has changed very little since Mir Ali Tabrizi had found the optimum composition of the letters and graphical rules. It has just been fine-tuned during the past seven centuries.  It has very strict rules for graphical shape of the letters and for combination of the letters, words, and composition of the whole calligraphy piece.

Modern calligraphy

Revival
After printing became ubiquitous from the 15th century onward, the production of illuminated manuscripts began to decline. However, the rise of printing did not mean the end of calligraphy. A clear distinction between handwriting and more elaborate forms of lettering and script began to make its way into manuscripts and books at the beginning of the 16th century.

The modern revival of calligraphy began at the end of the 19th century, influenced by the aesthetics and philosophy of William Morris and the Arts and Crafts movement. Edward Johnston is regarded as being the father of modern calligraphy. After studying published copies of manuscripts by architect William Harrison Cowlishaw, he was introduced to William Lethaby in 1898, principal of the Central School of Arts and Crafts, who advised him to study manuscripts at the British Museum.

This triggered Johnston's interest in the art of calligraphy with the use of a broad-edged pen. He began a teaching course in calligraphy at the Central School in Southampton Row, London from September 1899, where he influenced the typeface designer and sculptor Eric Gill. He was commissioned by  Frank Pick to design a new typeface for London Underground, still used today (with minor modifications).

He has been credited for reviving the art of modern penmanship and lettering single-handedly through his books and teachings – his handbook on the subject, Writing & Illuminating, & Lettering (1906) was particularly influential on a generation of British typographers and calligraphers, including Graily Hewitt, Stanley Morison, Eric Gill, Alfred Fairbank and Anna Simons. Johnston also devised the crafted round calligraphic handwriting style, written with a broad pen, known today as the Foundational hand. Johnston initially taught his students an uncial hand using a flat pen angle, but later taught his hand using a slanted pen angle. He first referred to this hand as "Foundational Hand" in his 1909 publication, Manuscript & Inscription Letters for Schools and Classes and for the Use of Craftsmen.

Subsequent developments
Graily Hewitt taught at the Central School of Arts and Crafts and published together with Johnston throughout the early part of the century. Hewitt was central to the revival of gilding in calligraphy, and his prolific output on type design also appeared between 1915 and 1943. He is attributed with the  revival of  gilding with gesso and gold leaf on vellum. Hewitt helped to found the Society of Scribes & Illuminators (SSI) in 1921, probably the world's foremost calligraphy society.

Hewitt is not without both critics and supporters in his rendering of Cennino Cennini's medieval gesso recipes. Donald Jackson, a British calligrapher, has sourced his gesso recipes from earlier centuries a number of which are not presently in English translation. Graily Hewitt created the patent announcing the award to Prince Philip of the title of Duke of Edinburgh on November 19, 1947, the day before his marriage to Queen Elizabeth.

Johnston's pupil, Anna Simons, was instrumental in sparking off interest in calligraphy in Germany with her German translation of Writing and Illuminating, and Lettering in 1910. Austrian Rudolf Larisch, a teacher of lettering at the Vienna School of Art, published six lettering books that greatly influenced German-speaking calligraphers. Because German-speaking countries had not abandoned the Gothic hand in printing, Gothic also had a powerful effect on their styles.

Rudolf Koch was a friend and younger contemporary of Larisch. Koch's books, type designs, and teaching made him one of the most influential calligraphers of the 20th century in northern Europe and later in the U.S. Larisch and Koch taught and inspired many European calligraphers, notably Karlgeorg Hoefer, and Hermann Zapf.

Contemporary typefaces used by computers, from word processors like Microsoft Word or Apple Pages to professional design software packages like Adobe InDesign, owe a considerable debt to the past and to a small number of professional typeface designers today.

See also

Notes

References

Works cited 

 
 
 
 
 
 
 
 
  10th Impression

External links 
 Calligraphy alphabets, a list of major historical scripts (simplified version) at Lettering Daily
 
 French Renaissance Paleography This is a scholarly maintained site that presents over 100 carefully selected French manuscripts from 1300 to 1700, with tools to decipher and transcribe them.

 
Articles containing video clips
Book arts
Penmanship
Typesetting
Intangible Cultural Heritage of Humanity